Robert Renner (born 8 March 1994 in Celje) is a Slovenian athlete specialising in the pole vault.

Career
He won the gold medal at the 2015 European U23 Championships.

His personal bests in the event are 5.65 metres outdoors (Pitesti 2015) and 5.62 metres indoors (Villeurbanne 2013). Both are current national records.

Competition record

References

1994 births
Living people
Sportspeople from Celje
Slovenian male pole vaulters
World Athletics Championships athletes for Slovenia
European Athletics Championships medalists
Athletes (track and field) at the 2016 Summer Olympics
Olympic athletes of Slovenia